The Galt, Preston and Hespeler Street Railway (GP&H) was an interurban electric street railway connecting the three nearby communities of Galt, Preston, and later Hespeler in Waterloo County (now Waterloo Region), Ontario, Canada.  The firm was organized in 1890, and began operation in 1894. In 1908 it merged with the Preston and Berlin Street Railway, with the new entity called the Berlin, Waterloo, Wellesley, and Lake Huron Railway Company.

In 1911, the line reached Hespeler, Berlin (later called Kitchener) and Waterloo. In 1914, the company was incorporated as the Grand River Railway. By 1916, the line was extended to Brantford/Port Dover.

See also

 Preston and Berlin Street Railway
 Grand River Railway
 Galt Subdivision
 Kitchener and Waterloo Street Railway
 List of street railways in Canada
 List of Ontario railways
 List of defunct Canadian railways

References

Further reading

External links

 

Predecessors of the Grand River Railway
Rail transport in Cambridge, Ontario
Passenger rail transport in Cambridge, Ontario
History of Cambridge, Ontario
History of rail transport in the Regional Municipality of Waterloo
Defunct Ontario railways
Electric railways in Canada
Railway companies established in 1890
Railway companies disestablished in 1908
Standard gauge railways in Canada